Bob Bosustow (8 June 1934 – 28 December 1997) was an Australian rules footballer who played with Carlton in the Victorian Football League (VFL).

His son Peter also played for Carlton in the 1980s.

References

External links

Bob Bosustow's profile at Blueseum

1934 births
1997 deaths
Carlton Football Club players
Perth Football Club players
Australian rules footballers from Western Australia
Place of birth missing